Aarght Records (sometimes stylised AARGHT! Records) was a record label run by Richard Stanley based in Melbourne, Victoria, Australia.

The label was started in 2007 by Richard with Mikey Young, Per Bystrom and Jonathan Wilmott, who played together in the band Ooga Boogas. By 2017, Richard ran the label with Jake Robertson, who was part of several Melbourne bands that released music on Aarght, such as Alien Nosejob, Ausmuteants, Hierophants, and Leather Towel.

Since its incarnation Aarght has released records by Total Control, Super Wild Horses, Eddy Current Suppression Ring, Ubik, and Nun. In 2009 Maximum Rocknroll called them "one of the finest modern purveyors of punk musics", while Vice wrote Aarght Records was "one of the most important independent records labels in Australia". They put out over 70 releases, vinyl, cassette, and CD up until 2019.

Aarght Records was taken over by record label Copacabana in 2017. 

The label's most recent release was 'Check The Odds', an album by Ill Globo which came out August 16, 2019. Since then many of Aarght Records' bands have released music on Anti Fade Records. In 2019 the two labels joined for a gig at Melbourne Music Week featuring their bands.

They continue to be recognised for their legacy of strong releases from Melbourne's punk and garage scene.

References

External links 
 

Record labels established in 2007
2007 establishments in Australia
Rock record labels
Record labels based in Melbourne
Australian independent record labels